Whitfield is a suburb of Cairns in the Cairns Region, Queensland, Australia.

Geography 
Whitfield has the following mountains:

 Lumley Hill 
 Mount Whitfield 

The southern portion of Whitfield is developed as residential land rising from sea level to about 50m up the slopes of Mount Whitfield. The northern part of the suburb is undeveloped bushland within the Mount Whitfield Conservation Park which occupies the upper slopes of Mount Whitfield which rises to 350m.

History 
Whitfield is situated in the Yidinji traditional Aboriginal country.

Whitfield State School opened on 23 January 1989.

Heritage listings
Whitfield has heritage listings including:
 16 Heavey Crescent: Oribin Studio

Education 

Whitfield State School is a government primary (Prep-6) school for boys and girls at 42-74 McManus Street. In 2018, the school had an enrolment of 831 students with 64 teachers (60 full-time equivalent) and 38 non-teaching staff (25 full-time equivalent). It includes a special education program.

There are no secondary schools in Whitfield. The nearest government secondary schools are Trinity Bay State High School in Manunda to the south-east and Cairns State High School in Cairns North to the east.

Amenities
There are a number of parks in the area:

 Colin Penridge Park
 Murchison Street Park

 Ross Allen Park

References

External links 

Suburbs of Cairns